Chong Khao station is a railway station located in Tham Yai Subdistrict, Thung Song District, Nakhon Si Thammarat. It is located adjacent to the Chong Khao Tunnel.

Train services 
 Local No. 445/446 Chumphon-Hat Yai Junction-Chumphon
 Local No. 447/448 Surat Thani-Sungai Kolok-Surat Thani

References 
 
 

Railway stations in Thailand